Le tableau parlant (The Talking Picture) is an opéra comique, described as a comédie-parade, in one act by André Grétry, The French libretto was by Louis Anseaume.

Performance history
It was first performed on 20 September 1769 by the Comédie-Italienne at the Hôtel de Bourgogne in Paris.

Roles

Synopsis
In the absence of Isabelle's lover Léandre, Cassandre persuades Isabelle to marry him instead. Cassandre leaves and in the meantime Léandre returns and Isabelle changes her mind. She asks Cassandre's portrait for his agreement to the changed state of affairs, only to find that Cassandre himself is concealed behind the picture.

References

Further reading
 "Tableau parlant, Le" by Michael Fend, in The New Grove Dictionary of Opera, ed. Stanley Sadie (London, 1992)

External links
 

Opéras comiques
French-language operas
Operas by André Grétry
One-act operas
Operas
1769 operas